Puot Kang Chol (born 1 January 1985) is a South Sudanese politician. Puot is currently the Minister of Petroleum in the Revitalized Transitional Government of National Unity (R-TGoNU) as of 2022. He is also a member of the Sudan People's Liberation Movement In-Opposition (SPLM-IO).

Early life and education 
Puot Kang was born in Mandeeng Village, Nasir County of Upper Nile State to Mr. Kang Chol and Mrs. Rebecca Nyayiech Chang. He started his education career at a School in Dima Refugee Camp in Ethiopia, where he completed primary level. He later joined Kebena Secondary School in Ethiopia where finished high school.

Puot thereafter, went to Kampala, Uganda where he was admitted at Cavendish University and graduated with a Bachelor of Law (LLB) in 2013.

Political career 
Puot was first appointed as Executive Director in the office of the then Deputy Secretary General of the SPLM Party Southern Sector, Dr. Ann Itto. He also served as Director of Membership and Recruitment in the SPLM in 2010, a position he held up to the eruption of the war in December 2013.

When South Sudan President Salva Kiir in 2013, accused his then Deputy Dr. Riek Machar of an attempted coup, Puot Kang was among some youth blamed of backing up Dr. Riek and forced to flee Juba together with other SPLM-IO members over fear of political persecution. He later joined SPLM-IO and was appointed the leader of the Youth League at the time.

However, after the signing of the revitalized peace agreement, Puot Kang returned to Juba together with Dr. Riek Machar and later appointed minister of petroleum when South Sudan announced a new unity government in 2020.

Achievements 
Since his appointment into office, Puot Kang has accomplished several projects including the completion of a unified human resource manual for employees in the country's oil sector, purchase of geophysical aircraft for surveying and generate geophysical aerial data of oil and other mineral resources in South Sudan and setting foundation for environmental audit on the impacts of oil in the environment in the country.

References

Living people
1985 births